Assaf Shaham (Hebrew: אסף שחם; born 1983) is an Israeli artist.

Biography 
Shaham was born in Jerusalem. He graduated from the Minshar School of Art in Tel Aviv in 2012. While still a student he was awarded the Shpilman International Prize for Excellence in Photography A year after his graduation he was awarded the Constantiner Photography Award for an Israeli Artist from Tel Aviv Museum of Art. Shaham studied at the Maumaus program in Lisbon and got his MFA from the 
University of Southern California. He divides his time between Tel Aviv and Los Angeles.

Solo exhibitions 

 2012. The king is dead, long live the king!, Tempo Rubato Gallery.
 2012. Assaf Shaham: New ways to steal old souls, Tel Aviv Museum of Art.
 2014. The Vision of Division, Braverman Gallery, Tel Aviv.
 2015. Division of the Vision, Yossi Milo Gallery, New York.

Awards 
 2011. Shpilman International Prize for Excellence in Photography.
 2012. The Constantiner Photography Award for and Israeli Artist.
 2017. Winner of the Ministry of Culture and Sports Young Artist Prize.

Collections 
Shaham's works are held in the following public collection:
Israel Museum, Jerusalem.

References 

Israeli photographers
1983 births
Jewish artists
Living people
Date of birth missing (living people)